Tuberactinomycin may refer to:

 Viomycin, the first tuberactinomycin found
 Enviomycin, also known as tuberactinomycin N

External link
 Deciphering Tuberactinomycin Biosynthesis: Isolation, Sequencing, and Annotation of the Viomycin Biosynthetic Gene Cluster, 2003 Sep on U.S. National Library of Medicine